GFE may refer to:

 Goal-free evaluation
 GeForce Experience
 General Further Education, in the United Kingdom and Ireland
 Girlfriend experience
 Glenferrie railway station, in Victoria, Australia
 Good faith estimate
 Government-Furnished Equipment, a term of art for equipment furnished by the US Federal government to fulfill contract obligations under Federal Acquisition Regulations
 Guinness Flavour Extract, used in the production of Guinness Foreign Extra Stout